George William Wright (born 10 October 1919) was an English professional footballer who played as a goalkeeper.

Career
Goalkeeper Wright played against future club Colchester United for Plymouth Argyle's reserves side (the first visiting side to win at Layer Road) before moving to the club in 1949, where he made 195 appearances in The Football League and the Southern Football League.

He established himself in the team and was a main last line of defence at the club until 1955.

References

External links
 
 
 George Wright at Colchester United Archive Database

1919 births
Association football goalkeepers
English footballers
Plymouth Argyle F.C. players
Colchester United F.C. players
English Football League players
Year of death missing